Aadhi is a 2018 Indian Malayalam-language action thriller drama film written and directed by Jeethu Joseph. The film stars Pranav Mohanlal in the title role (in his debut adult role) and features Jagapathi Babu, Siddique, Lena, Aditi Ravi, Anusree, Sharaf U Dheen, Siju Wilson, Meghanathan, Sijoy Varghese, Tony Luke, and Krishna Shankar in supporting roles. It was produced by Antony Perumbavoor through Aashirvad Cinemas. The original soundtrack for the film was composed by Anil Johnson. Aadhi also mark Pranav's debut as a singer-songwriter with the song "Gypsy Women" he wrote, sung, and performed.

The principal photography took place between August and November 2017 in Kochi, Bangalore, and Hyderabad. Aadhi was released in India on 26 January 2018 and met with positive critical response. The film was a major commercial success, becoming one of the highest-grossing Malayalam films of the year and ran over 100 days in theatres.

Plot
Aadhi aspires to become a music director in cinema who is doing local singing gigs. He receives some support from his father, Mohan Varma, a successful businessman, he is not so optimistic about Aadhi's musical career and wants him to earn a livelihood from the business. His mother, Rosy, however, supports his wishes except for the parkour.

Aadhi is trying hard to get a breakthrough. Mohan sends Aadhi to take his friend Roy's car to Bangalore to receive Roy after his foreign trip. In Bangalore, Aadhi goes to a nightclub where eminent personalities from the music industry gather and seeks an opportunity to perform a musical to catch their attention. But circumstantially cause the death of a person who is the son of a greatly influential figure. The deceased was the son of Narayana Reddy, the owner of Pinnacle Group. Jayakrishnan intimidates Anjana and frames Aadhi for the death, and informs Reddy, who seeks to take revenge on Aadhi.

Reddy uses his influence to make it an accidental death to avoid police intervention and starts an underground manhunt for Aadhi, using a picture of him captured by the security camera in the club. Reddy gets hold of the car that Aadhi brought to the pub, his dad's boss's one, and through the security cam footage that he stays somewhere on the Bangalore-Mysore road. He sends his goons to catch Aadhi, while unbeknownst to all of it, he is in the streets. But using his free-running skills, he evades the goons only to end up with Sharath.

Sharath takes him home and tells him about the bounty Reddy has placed on him. Sharath also tells him that he will help him as Reddy has caused ill fates to his family, and is the sole reason why his family is this way. Sharath agrees to help him and his sister Jaya approves of that. Sharath takes help from his friend Mani Annan and decides to plot an escape plan, all to go to waste. Aadhi meets up with his dad at Sharath's home and decides to go abroad. He takes refuge in an abandoned factory until his escape plan is done.

Meanwhile, Reddy urges the cops to have a lookout for Aadhi, and all the transport routes are inspected for Aadhi's suspected departure. Aadhi, having lost his phone, keeps on his communicating with his parents through Sharath, and this intrigues Reddy, who decides to go for call tracing on that. Suspecting his activities to be disclosed, Jayakrishnan readily takes over the responsibility of monitoring the calls. He overhears the call and confirms Aadhi's location, and goes with some goons to get done with Aadhi. Aadhi somehow escapes from them and interprets that Jayakrishnan has been tapping his phone calls.

Jayakrishnan, having learned of Sharath's role in Aadhi's hideout, captures him and murders him before Sharath discloses Jayakrishnan's role in the death of Reddy's son. This creates a stir, and Aadhi is forced to leave the hideout. Aadhi plots a new plan to disclose things to Reddy, as the situation brings him to the conclusion that Jayakrishnan devised the whole plan to save face because Reddy might kill him if he is found guilty. Aadhi takes help from Mani Annan and a former employee of the Pinnacle Group, Ebin, to disclose to Reddy all the happenings at his office in Bangalore.

As per Ebin's request, he gets hold of gadgets to gain access to the security cam footage of the building and thereby get to Reddy's office. He also uses Anjana to devise a plan so that Jayakrishnan stays out of the office and passes information that he is going to meet Reddy at an event outside his office late one day. Jayakrishnan leaves the office soon. Aadhi gets inside the office through the service exit, and Anjana through the front door, which alerts Jayakrishnan, who returns soon after.

Meanwhile, Aadhi and Anjana reach Reddy's office, only for Reddy to attack Aadhi, who later convinces Reddy of Jayakrishnan's part in the ploy. Jayakrishnan soon comes and shoots Reddy, and leaves him for dead, and along with Siddharth, aka Siddhu discloses them as partners intending on killing Reddy and taking his wealth. Siddhu never intended on sharing and turns on Jayakrishnan and kills him and moves to kill Aadhi and Anjana as well. Aadhi makes a quick run for it and reaches the 10th floor of the building.

Aadhi is taken out by the guards before he could rappel out and Siddhu gets down to kill him. Before Siddhu could shoot him, it is revealed that the 10th-floor exit was an escape plan, and Aadhi performs a Dülfersitz just before Ebin turns the fire alarm on, to shower gasoline on them. Aadhi throws a lighter and escapes out in the ensuing explosion. Reddy recovers, and it is revealed that Aadhi is set free, and Jayakrishnan and Siddhu were killed because of the explosion on the 10th floor.

Cast 

 Pranav Mohanlal as Aadhithya Mohan / Aadhi
 Jagapathi Babu as Narayana Reddy
 Siddique as Mohan Varma, Aadhi's father
 Lena as Rosy, Aadhi's mother
 Aditi Ravi as Anjana, Aadhi's classmate 
 Anusree as Jaya, Sarath's elder sister 
 Sijoy Varghese as Siddharth / Siddhu
 Siju Wilson as Jayakrishnan
 Meghanathan as Mani Annan
 Sharaf U Dheen as Sarath Nair
 Tony Luke as Ebin
 Krishna Shankar as Nadhir, Aadhi's friend 
 Kritika Pradeep as Anu, a girl who has a crush on Aadhi 
 Mohanlal as Himself (Cameo appearance)
 Antony Perumbavoor as Himself (Cameo appearance)
 Jeethu Joseph as Man walking in street (Cameo appearance)
 Roy C. J. as Himself (Cameo appearance)
 Nithin Hari as Reddy's Son

Production

Development 

On 30 September 2016, Mohanlal announced that his son Pranav Mohanlal would be acting in a film directed by Jeethu Joseph and produced by Aashirvad Cinemas, which would be a thriller. The film marks the return of Pranav as an actor, who had earlier appeared as child actor. He had worked with Jeethu as an assistant director in two filmsPapanasam and Life of Josutty. The project was green-lit a few days before the announcement when Jeethu had a discussion with Pranav. After learning Pranav wanted to return to acting, Jeethu approached him with an abstract idea of a film and received positive feedback.

Jeethu was in charge of writing; he had completed the story by the time of the announcement and had begun writing the screenplay, intending it to be his next directorial. He described the film as an action movie and a thriller, but it will not resemble a thriller like his 2013 film Memories. Jeethu had developed the story idea during his college education. His protagonist was a marathon or cross country runner, whose athletic skills aid him in the story. For the film, it was changed to parkour since Pranav had learned it during his academic life. The entire plot takes place within one week or 10 days. By the end of March 2017, Jeethu said he was working on the script and hoped to start filming by June, with the rest of the cast finalizing after the first draft is prepared. In early May, Jeethu confirmed that the first draft was complete and they were about to enter pre-production, with the filming planned to begin in the second half of 2017. In mid-May he stated that he is still working on the screenplay.

In early July 2017, Jeethu said he intended to start filming by the end of that month. For the film, Pranav trained in parkour. The title Aadhi along with an animated digital poster were revealed on 5 July at the puja function of the film held at hotel Vivanta by Taj in Thycaud, Thiruvananthapuram. The venue was shared with the puja of Aashirvad Cinemas's Odiyan. Aadhi is billed with the tagline, "some lies can be deadly". Satheesh Kurup was signed as the cinematographer, while Anil Johnson as music composer.

Casting 

Pranav plays Aadhi, an urban youth who loves music and aspires to become a music director. Although Pranav was described about his character, Jeethu gave him freedom to mould the character accordingly. In August 2017, Siddique, Sharaf U Dheen, and Siju Wilson were confirmed in prominent roles. Initially Sunny Wayne was signed for a role but had to cancel because of scheduling conflicts. The film has no romantic track. The leading female roles were played by Anusree, Aditi Ravi, and Lena. Aditi plays Anjana, a Bangalore-based Malayali banking professional. She was suggested to Jeethu by cinematographer Satheesh Kurup, who worked in her debut film Alamara; Aditi was cast after a screen test. Siddique and Lena play Aadhi's father and mother. Also in August 2017, confirming his presence, Tony Luke shared his character look on a social networking site, sporting a thick beard. By the end of the month, Jagapati Babu was confirmed to be in the cast in a significant role.

Filming 

Preliminary principal photography commenced on 5 July 2017 at hotel Vivanta by Taj in Thycaud, Thiruvananthapuram after a puja function held at the same venueit was a single brief shot featuring Pranav. The regular filming began on 1 August 2017 in Nedumbassery, Kochi. Pranav was seen playing a guitar in the scene stills taken on the day. Early in this schedule, some scenes were filmed inside a studio near Pathadipalam in Kochi, inside which a house was created in set. Pranav and Anusree were present in that segment. The first schedule in Kochi continued until 10 August and the second schedule began in Bangalore the following week. The schedule was expected to continue until mid-September and then shift to Hyderabad by the end of the month.

In early September, Jeethu said the crew had already filmed two songs of the three songs. The unit finished filming in Bangalore and shifted to Hyderabad earlier than scheduled due to rain. Filming began at Ramoji Film City in Hyderabad from 3 September; the scenes including an office, a building, a club, and a dance bar had originally been planned for Bangalore but were shot in Ramoji Film City instead. The schedule in Ramoji Film City was planned for 20 days. The film also had location shooting in a few streets in Hyderabad. Pranav, Aditi, and Anusree took part in this schedule. Jeethu's spouse Linta Jeethu was the film's costume designer.

Pranav received the screenplay early and had several discussions with Jeethu, who said, "because he has been through the script so many times, he is able to add his improvisations" and "directing him has been a seamless experience". By the end of September 2017, Jeethu said they had one month of shoot left in Hyderabad and would soon film the action scenes, for which a foreign stunt director would join the unit. After completing the action scenes, the crew would shift again between Kochi and Bangalore. On 23 October, the unit returned to Kochi to begin the final phase of filming; the climax scenes were shot in the next two days.

Pranav was injured while breaking glass for a scene. While performing an action scene in Kochi, Pranav's finger bruised and bled; he was taken to a hospital and was prescribed two days' rest. The crew had only three days of filming left and were about to return to Hyderabad for the weekend. Since the upcoming action scenes require many hand movements, filming was postponed to the next week. They were permitted to shoot only at weekends. When the first poster of the film was released on 4 November, Jeethu wrote on his social networking page that the final phase of filming was progressing in Hyderabad. Filming was wrapped on 8 November 2017.

Music 

Anil Johnson composed the music for the film, it features three songs. Besides acting, Pranav made his debut as a playback singer and songwriter with a retro English track in the film. When Jeethu asked, Pranav expressed interest in writing and singing the track that appears in a live performance scene in the film. He also played the guitar. Johnson was confident of Pranav's singing and guitar skills. Titling the song, finalizing the tune, and recording, was done in Kochi after Pranav returned from the final filming schedule in Hyderabad. "Sooryane", a single from the film was released by Goodwill Entertainments label on 5 January 2018 for digital download and as music video on YouTube. It was sung by Najim Arshad and written by Santhosh Varma. The music work was done at Blacknoise studio in Kochi and 20 dB Studios in Chennai.

Release
The makers initially targeted a release by Christmas 2017, but in August that year, Jeethu confirmed the film would not be released at Christmas because filming was expected to finish by October and the film would have an extensive post-production. In early November 2017, Jeethu stated they had a few more days of filming left but had already begun the post-production work to ensure a release by the end of January 2018. Release date was confirmed in December 2017. Aadhi released in India on 26 January 2018.

Critical reception
Aadhi opened to positive response from critics. Anna M. M. Vetticad from Firstpost rated 3.5 out of 5 stars and wrote that "Pranav Mohanlal is a perfect fit for a smashing action flick" and called it "one of the most exciting rollercoaster rides ever to emerge from Malayalam cinema ... Aadhi is marked by some clever writing, slick execution, top-notch production values and chases that are so frickin' awesome, they rival the Bourne films although Mollywood works on a fraction of the budget of an average Hollywood venture" and "Parkour is not Pranav's only strength. He is sweet-looking and a natural before the camera". Meera Suresh of The New Indian Express also gave 3.5 out of 5 and called it "an impressive debut from Pranav", stating that "it is a film made just for Pranav, to announce his arrival, and it is nothing less than grand ... Pranav makes it all worthwhile. With mind-boggling action sequences and enough screen presence, Mohanlal's son makes a comfortable debut, winning us with his charisma ... Full marks for the terrific performance in the action sequences, which are the film's highlights".

G. Ragesh of Malayala Manorama awarded 3.5 in a scale of 5 and said: "Pranav Mohanlal, perhaps, could not have waited for a better cinematic package than Aadhi to mark his entry to Malayalam cinema as a lead actor. The Jeethu Joseph directorial offers everything that a film in the populist mold can offer and explore all aspects of Pranav's acting skills" and "at the center of the narrative is a convincing performance by Pranav as an innocent young dreamer as well as a courageous and smart parkour expert". Describing the film "a thrilling ride", Sify critic rated 3 out of 5 and wrote: "Aadhi is an entertaining journey of a youth, which gives you some edge of the seat moments with his action skills ... In a role that demands tremendous acrobatic skills, Pranav Mohanlal makes a confident debut as a hero. He performs in a dedicated way and is a delight to watch as he unleashes his amazing athletic prowess" and "it's a rather simple storyline, and Jeethu Joseph has evidently tried to keep the viewers engaged using a fast paced presentation".

Manoj Kumar R. of The Indian Express awarded 3 out of 5 stars and stated that "Pranav's performance in action sequences is one of the mainstays in the film. Shot in real locations, Pranav draws applause for his skills in free running or popularly known as Parkour ... What makes this film works is Jeethu's equal distribution of responsibilities to each character to take the story forward. Even as Aadhi is a hero-centric film, Jeethu has treated Pranav's role as just the first among the equals". Deccan Chronicle critic also gave 3 stars out of 5 and said the film is "a high-octane, action-packed drama keeps audience, irrespective of ages, engaged. Pranav deserves one extra pat on the back for proving himself as a seasoned stuntman in his first movie outing". However, "the first half drags a bit". Deepa Soman of The Times of India also rated 3 out of 5 and said: "Pranav effortlessly portrays the soft-spoken, free-spirited Aadhi. He seems to have given his all for the numerous chasing and stunt scenes ... Aadhi deserves your time if you can look past the familiarity of the story, and want to enjoy a mix of Mohanlal nostalgia, stunts and the genuine efforts of a newbie actor to breathe life into his debut character".

Box office
The film was a commercial success at the box office, becoming one of the highest-grossing Malayalam films of the year. It grossed 50 Crore from the box office worldwide and ran over 100 days in theatres. In the opening weekend (9–11 February), the film grossed $42,907 (₹32.19 lakh) from 38 screens in the United States and £2,666 from two theatres in the United Kingdom. It collected £25,583 (₹23.19 lakh) from 94 screens in the UK in the second week. In four weeks, the film grossed $85,982 (₹55.98 lakh) in the US and £50,571 (₹45.34 lakh) in the UK. In the opening weekend (15–18 February), it grossed $403,843 from 41 screens in the United Arab Emirates (UAE)—second best opener of that weekend (behind Black Panther) and $9,557 from 3 screens in New Zealand. It collected $526,393 from the UAE in four weeks and $10,851 from New Zealand in two weeks. Three week gross in New Zealand was NZ$14,875.

Awards
Pranav won the Best Debut Actor award at the 8th South Indian International Movie Awards (SIIMA). Lena also won the SIIMA Award for Best Actress in a Supporting Role. Anusree won the award for Best Character Actress at the 21st Asianet Film Awards.

References

External links 
 

2010s Malayalam-language films
Films directed by Jeethu Joseph
2018 action thriller films
Indian action thriller films
Films shot in Kochi
Films shot at Ramoji Film City
Films shot in Bangalore
Parkour in film
Films set in Bangalore
Aashirvad Cinemas films